Amphiglossus reticulatus is a species of skink. It is endemic to Madagascar.

References

reticulatus
Endemic fauna of Madagascar
Reptiles described in 1922
Taxa named by Walter Kaudern